Dezső Orosz (born 11 April 1887, date of death unknown) was a Hungarian wrestler. He competed in the lightweight event at the 1912 Summer Olympics.

References

External links
 

1887 births
Year of death missing
Olympic wrestlers of Hungary
Wrestlers at the 1912 Summer Olympics
Hungarian male sport wrestlers
Sportspeople from Hajdú-Bihar County